Robert Bostwick Carney Jr. (September 24, 1919 – March 9, 1983) was a United States Marine Corps brigadier general who served in World War II and the Vietnam War.

Early life and education
Carney was born in Washington, D.C. on 24 September 1919, the son of naval officer and future admiral Robert Carney and Grace Carney. He graduated from Western High School and Dartmouth College.

Military career

World War II
Carney joined the United States Marine Corps in 1941 and was commissioned in April 1942.

Carney participated in the Bougainville Campaign and was awarded the Bronze Star Medal and Purple Heart for his actions during the Battle of Iwo Jima. On Iwo Jima he led Company G of  3rd Battalion, 28th Marines, which cleared the right flank of Mount Suribachi on 22 February 1945 (D+3).

On his return from the Pacific he was stationed at Long Beach. On 19 February 1944 he was engaged to Miss Natalie Sutherland, daughter of General Richard K. Sutherland.

He commanded the Marine Barracks, Washington, D.C. from 1964 to 1968.

Vietnam War
Carney served as assistant division commander of the 3rd Marine Division from 8 November 1968 to 9 June 1969. From 1 April to 21 May 1969 he commanded Task Force Hotel in western Quảng Trị Province, during which time it conducted Operation Purple Martin. He subsequently commanded the 9th Marine Amphibious Brigade on Okinawa from 13 June to 7 November 1969.

Later life
Carney retired from the Marines in June 1972. He died on 9 March 1983 and was survived by his wife Natalie, a son and a daughter. He was buried at Arlington National Cemetery.

Decorations
His decorations include the Legion of Merit (2), Bronze Star Medal and Purple Heart.

References

Bibliography

1919 births
1983 deaths
United States Marine Corps personnel of the Vietnam War
United States Marine Corps personnel of World War II
Burials at Arlington National Cemetery
Dartmouth College alumni
Recipients of the Legion of Merit
Military personnel from Washington, D.C.
United States Marine Corps generals